The 1990 Green Bay Packers season was their 72nd season overall and their 70th in the National Football League. The team finished with a 6–10 record under third-year coach Lindy Infante, earning them a fourth-place finish in the NFC Central division.

Offseason

NFL Draft

Personnel

Staff

Roster

Notable additions included LeRoy Butler, John Jurkovic, Bryce Paup and Jackie Harris

Regular season

Schedule

Note: Intra-division opponents are in bold text.

Standings

References

External links
 1990 Green Bay Packers at Pro-Football-Reference.com

Green Bay Packers
Green Bay Packers seasons
Green